This is a list of wars involving the Republic of Chad.

Notes

References 

 List
Wars